The 2005 NCAA Division I Field Hockey Championship was the 25th women's collegiate field hockey tournament organized by the National Collegiate Athletic Association, to determine the top college field hockey team in the United States. The Maryland Terrapins won their fourth championship, defeating the Duke Blue Devils in the final. The semifinals and championship were hosted by the University of Louisville at Trager Stadium in Louisville, Kentucky.

Bracket

References 

2005
Field Hockey
2005 in women's field hockey
Sports competitions in Louisville, Kentucky
2005 in sports in Kentucky